Asadur Rahman is a Jatiya Party (Ershad) politician and the former Member of Parliament of Nilphamari-4.

Career
Rahman was elected to parliament from Nilphamari-4 as a Jatiya Party candidate in 1996.

References

Jatiya Party politicians
Living people
7th Jatiya Sangsad members
Year of birth missing (living people)